The Fudge House is a historic residence in the city of Covington, Virginia, United States. The earliest log section dates to about 1798, with additions and modifications made about 1826, 1897, and 1910.  The resultant house is a two-story, weatherboarded structure of log, frame, and brick construction with a hipped roof, and four exterior chimneys.  Also on the property is a contributing smokehouse and the ruins of a slave cabin and a third house.

It was added to the National Register of Historic Places in 1993.

References

Houses on the National Register of Historic Places in Virginia
Houses completed in 1890
Houses in Covington, Virginia
National Register of Historic Places in Covington, Virginia
Slave cabins and quarters in the United States